RCD Espanyol in European football is an article about RCD Espanyol and their record in Europe football competitions. They have played the UEFA Cup/Europa League eight times, reaching the final twice and losing both on penalties. They also competed in the Inter-Cities Fairs Cup twice.

Overall record

UEFA Competitions

Non-UEFA Competitions

Year by Year Performance
Below is a table of the performance of RCD Espanyol in European competitions.

External links
Official website

European football
Espanyol